Runc may refer to:

Places in Romania
 Runc, a district in the town of Zlatna, Alba County
 Runc, a village in Ocoliș Commune, Alba County
 Runc, a village in Scărișoara Commune, Alba County
 Runc, a village in Vidra Commune, Alba County
 Runc, a village in Sărmaș Commune, Harghita County
 Runc, an alternative name for the river Govăjdia in Hunedoara County
 Runc, a tributary of the Crișul Pietros in Bihor County
 Runc (Jaleș), a tributary of the Jaleș in Gorj County
 Runc, a tributary of the Mara in Maramureș County
 Runc, a tributary of the Săpânța in Maramureș County
 Runc, a tributary of the Someș in Satu Mare County
 Runc (Someșul Mare), a tributary of the Someșul Mare in Bistrița-Năsăud County

Computing
 runC, a container management tool from Open Container Initiative

See also
 Runcu (disambiguation)